"Hook Me Up" is the debut single by Australian R&B/pop group CDB. "Hook Me Up" was written by band member Andrew De Silva, Paul Gray (of Wa Wa Nee) and Byron Jones, Raymond Medhurst and Jonathan Jones (of The Rockmelons). released in October 1994 as the lead single from their debut studio album, Glide with Me (1995). The song peaked at number 11 on the ARIA Charts and was certified gold.

Track listing
'''CD single (660741 2)
 "Hook Me Up"  (Radio Edit) – 3:47
 "2 Nite I'm Yours" – 5:19
 "Hook Me Up"  (Wicked Mix)	 – 4:15
 "Hook Me Up" (Swing Mix) – 3:36
 "Hook Me Up"  (Instrumental) – 3:45

Charts
"Hook Me Up" debuted at No. 38 in Australia in November 1994, before rising to a peak of No. 11 in December 1994. The song remained in the top 50 for 14 weeks.

Accredications

References

1994 songs
1994 debut singles
CDB (band) songs
Sony Music Australia singles
Songs written by Andrew De Silva
Songs written by Paul Gray (songwriter)